Vitis × doaniana (Doan's grape) is a hybrid grape resulting from the natural hybridization of Vitis mustangensis with Vitis acerifolia.  Its native range is Oklahoma, Colorado, Texas, and New Mexico.

References

 
 USDA Natural Resources Conservation Service, PLANTS Profile for Vitis × doaniana Munson ex Viala (pro sp.) (acerifolia × mustangensis).
 Encyclopedia of Life, Vitis doaniana Munson ex Viala (pro sp.), Doan's grape.

doaniana
Plants described in 1890
Hybrid grape varieties
Interspecific plant hybrids